Best A Cappella is the third Japan-only compilation album of songs by the a cappella group Rockapella. When the group changed their Japanese record label to Rentrack Records and released two of their American albums and an additional compilation album in Japan, ForLife Records sought to capitalize on the renewed publicity and released this album of previous recordings. It is seen as an unaffiliated release since Rockapella no longer had a contract with ForLife Records at the time of its release, and therefore do not receive royalties for its purchases.

Track listing

Personnel
Scott Leonard – high tenor
Sean Altman – tenor
Elliot Kerman – baritone
Barry Carl – bass
Jeff Thacher – vocal percussion

Rockapella albums
2002 compilation albums